(1683-1720) was a Japanese samurai of the Edo period. A senior retainer of the Sendai domain, he was first known as Kageakira (景明). Murayasu was also the fifth Katakura Kojūrō. His childhood name was Sannosueke (三之助) later changed to Kojūrō. His father was  Katakura Muranaga and his Mother was Matsumae Ichiko.

External links
Katakura family tree (in Japanese)

1683 births
1720 deaths
Samurai
Katakura clan